The following radio stations broadcast on FM frequency 101.1 MHz:

Argentina
 LRM944 in Esperanza, Santa Fe (it has assigned 101.3 MHz.)
 LRS774 in San Genaro, Santa Fe
 Calchaquí in Tafí del Valle, Tucumán
 del Sur in San Juan
 Oxigeno in Suardi, Santa Fe
 Planet Music in Mar del Plata, Buenos Aires
 Trentina in San Salvador de Jujuy, Jujuy
 Winner in Rosario, Santa Fe

Australia
 4QAA in Mackay, Queensland
 3TTT in Melbourne, Victoria
 Triple J in Armidale, New South Wales
 Triple J in Wagga Wagga, New South Wales
 Triple J in Roxby Downs, South Australia
 Triple J in Mildura, Victoria
 Simple Of Dan¡ in Mildura, Victoria

Belize
KREM FM  at Caye Caulker; Camalote Village; Dangriga, Stann Creek District

Canada (Channel 266)
 CBCT-FM-1 in St. Edward, Prince Edward Island
 CBF-FM-10 in Sherbrooke, Quebec
 CBGA-FM-7 in Ste-Anne-des-Monts, Quebec
 CBQV-FM in Sandy Lake, Ontario
 CBUK-FM in Kitimat, British Columbia
 CFAI-FM in Edmundston, New Brunswick
 CFIF-FM in Iroquois Falls, Ontario
 CFLZ-FM in Fort Erie, Ontario
 CFMI-FM in New Westminster, British Columbia
 CFPE-FM in Banff, Alberta
 CFTI-FM in Big Cove, New Brunswick
 CHFA-10-FM in Edmonton, Alberta
 CHFG-FM in Chisasibi, Quebec
 CHLI-FM in Rossland, British Columbia
 CHOX-FM-2 in Ste-Perpetue, Quebec
 CIFF-FM in Flin Flon, Manitoba
 CIQB-FM in Barrie, Ontario
 CICW-FM in Centre Wellington, Ontario
 CIXF-FM in Brooks, Alberta
 CJFY-FM-1 in Miramichi City, New Brunswick
 CJRI-FM-1 in Woodstock, New Brunswick
 CKBY-FM in Smiths Falls, Ontario
 CKBZ-FM-2 in Chase, British Columbia
 CKEY-FM in Fort Erie, Ontario
 CKMQ-FM in Merritt, British Columbia
 CKSJ-FM in St. John's, Newfoundland and Labrador
 CKXA-FM in Brandon, Manitoba
 VF2051 in Tumbler Ridge, British Columbia
 VF2151 in McBride, British Columbia
 VF2212 in Carrot River, Saskatchewan
 VF2327 in Bralorne, British Columbia
 VF2376 in La Ronge, Saskatchewan
 VF2584 in Rock Creek, British Columbia
 VF8023 in Aylesford, Nova Scotia
 VOAR-6-FM in Botwood, Newfoundland and Labrador
 CBMN-FM in Malartic, Quebec

Cayman Islands
 ZFKI-FM at Grand Cayman

China 
 CNR Music Radio in Nanning

Federated States of Micronesia
BBC World Service at Pohnpei

Malaysia
 Minnal FM in Johor Bahru, Johor and Singapore
 MY in Kuantan, Pahang
 Radio Klasik in Kota Bharu, Kelantan

Mexico
 XHAT-FM in Ensenada, Baja California
XHCSAD-FM in Pijijiapan, Chiapas
 XHCSAH-FM in Ríoverde, San Luis Potosi
 XHDN-FM in Gómez Palacio, Durango
 XHERW-FM in León, Guanajuato
 XHJHS-FM in Querétaro, Querétaro
 XHMA-FM in Zapopan, Jalisco
 XHMPO-FM in Ocampo, Coahuila
 XHPER-FM in Perote, Veracruz
 XHRFB-FM in Bacerac, Sonora
 XHRFD-FM in Divisaderos, Sonora
 XHRFS-FM in Bacadehuachi, Sonora
 XHSCCS-FM in Cuernavaca, Morelos
 XHSJO-FM in Santiago Juxtlahuaca, Oaxaca
XHSPRT-FM in Tapachula, Chiapas
XHUANT-FM in Tepic, Nayarit
 XHVSS-FM in Hermosillo, Sonora
 XHWGR-FM in Monclova, Coahuila

Philippines
 DWYS IN Pasig
 
 DYIO in Cebu City
 DXRR-FM in Davao City

United States (Channel 266)
  in Fairbanks, Alaska
 KBER in Ogden, Utah
 KBHP in Bemidji, Minnesota
 KBON in Mamou, Louisiana
 KBTP in Mertzon, Texas
 KCFX in Harrisonville, Missouri
 KDBN in Parachute, Colorado
 KDDX in Spearfish, South Dakota
 KDSR in Williston, North Dakota
 KDXE in Cammack Village, Arkansas
 KEOJ in Caney, Kansas
  in Cheney, Washington
 KFHW-LP in Billings, Montana
  in Oberlin, Kansas
 KFUG-LP in Crescent City, California
 KFUR-LP in Saint George, Utah
 KHYL in Auburn, California
 KJBS-LP in Mena, Arkansas
  in Olive Branch, Mississippi
 KLAB in Siloam Springs, Arkansas
  in Columbus, Nebraska
 KLMD in Talent, Oregon
 KLOL in Houston, Texas
  in Luverne, Minnesota
 KMGP-LP in Magnuson Park, Washington
 KNUT in Garapan-Saipan, Northern Mariana Islands
 KNVO-FM in Port Isabel, Texas
 KOHF-LP in Florence Community, Arizona
  in Leavenworth, Washington
 KONE (FM) in Lubbock, Texas
  in Helotes, Texas
  in Waianae, Hawaii
 KOSI in Denver, Colorado
 KOWJ-LP in Lufkin, Texas
  in Pinedale, Wyoming
 KPKK in Amargosa Valley, Nevada
  in Kanab, Utah
  in Valley City, North Dakota
 KRIV-FM in Winona, Minnesota
  in Oil City, Louisiana
 KROW in Cody, Wyoming
  in Lake Havasu City, Arizona
 KRTH in Los Angeles, California
 KSFR in White Rock, New Mexico
 KTJN-LP in Gold Beach, Oregon
 KUHH-LP in Hilo, Hawaii
 KVIB-LP in San Diego, California
  in Hatch, New Mexico
 KVNM-LP in Veguita, New Mexico
 KVOK-FM in Kodiak, Alaska
  in Stillwater, Oklahoma
 KVXL-LP in Las Vegas, Nevada
 KWCA (FM) in Weaverville, California
  in Woodward, Oklahoma
 KWYD in Parma, Idaho
  in Fresno, California
  in Marshalltown, Iowa
 KXL-FM in Portland, Oregon
 KZCE in Cordes Lake, Arizona
  in Helena, Montana
  in Valdosta, Georgia
  in Naples Park, Florida
  in Philadelphia, Pennsylvania
 WBRU-LP in Providence, Rhode Island
  in Newport Village, New York
  in New York, New York
 WDCK in Bloomfield, Indiana
 WDKK-LP in Hollywood, Florida
 WDVS-LP in Miami, Florida
 WDZP-LP in West Palm Beach, Florida
 WFGE in State College, Pennsylvania
 WFOO-LP in Providence, Rhode Island
  in Manchester, New Hampshire
  in Youngstown, Ohio
 WZPN in Glasford, Illinois
 WHSM-FM in Hayward, Wisconsin
 WHYA in Mashpee, Massachusetts
 WIAM-LP in Knoxville, Tennessee
 WICO-FM in Snow Hill, Maryland
 WIOE-FM in South Whitley, Indiana
 WIXX in Green Bay, Wisconsin
 WIZF in Erlanger, Kentucky
 WJFS-LP in Gatlinburg, Tennessee
 WJQY-LP in Wilson, North Carolina
  in Cocoa Beach, Florida
 WKQX in Chicago, Illinois
 WLIN-FM in Durant, Mississippi
  in Ellijay, Georgia
 WLVH in Hardeeville, South Carolina
  in New Orleans, Louisiana
 WOSA in Grove City, Ohio
 WPJM-LP in Palatka, Florida
  in Repton, Alabama
  in Roscommon, Michigan
  in Belhaven, North Carolina
 WRIF in Detroit, Michigan
  in Ponce, Puerto Rico
 WRIZ-LP in Boca Raton, Florida
 WROQ in Anderson, South Carolina
 WRR (FM) in Dallas, Texas
  in Hazard, Kentucky
 WTEC-LP in Sarasota, Florida
  in Thomaston, Georgia
 WTTP-LP in Lima, Ohio
  in Machias, Maine
  in Russellville, Kentucky
  in Ontonagon, Michigan
 WVMG-LP in Chattanooga, Tennessee
  in Dickeyville, Wisconsin
 WVVX-LP in Providence, Rhode Island
 WVWP-LP in Wayne, West Virginia
 WWDC (FM) in Washington, District of Columbia
 WWOV-LP in Martins Ferry, Ohio
 WWPN (FM) in Westernport, Maryland
 WWUU in Washington, Mississippi
 WXEZ-LP in Hillsville, Virginia
 WXOS in East St. Louis, Illinois
 WXRM-LP in Cape May Court House, New Jersey
 WXJC-FM in Cullman, Alabama
 WYMY in Burlington, North Carolina
 WYOO in Springfield, Florida
 WZTZ in Elba, Alabama

References

Lists of radio stations by frequency